Eoghan Quigg is the only studio album by Northern Irish pop singer Eoghan Quigg, released on 6 April 2009. Quigg, who finished third in the fifth series of the UK television talent show The X Factor, was the first of the finalists from that series to release a studio album. The record predominantly features cover versions of songs that Quigg performed on The X Factor, and one original song, "28,000 Friends".

On its release, the album was described by multiple critics as the worst ever recorded. Its commercial failure led to Quigg being dropped by RCA Records.

Background
After finishing third in The X Factor in 2008, Quigg was signed by record label RCA Records. Quigg began work on the album in London in early 2009, and was given a week to record it. The album was recorded at Sphere Studios in Battersea and released on 6 April 2009 in the UK. Quigg described the album's musical direction as drawing inspiration from Busted, and two songs from the album were written by ex-Busted band members, "Year 3000" being written by James Bourne and Charlie Simpson, and "28,000 Friends" by Bourne.

Critical reception

Eoghan Quigg was savaged by critics. Jon O'Brien of AllMusic described the album as "bad karaoke", with deficient production values failing to hide Quigg's "limited ability" and "bum notes". Nick Levine of Digital Spy called it "amateurish as well as utterly redundant". One track singled out for criticism by multiple reviewers was the cover of Take That's "Never Forget", the vocal performance on which was described by Levine as "positively wince-inducing". Gigwise placed the record at number one in their "The 20 Worst Albums of 2009" in December of that year.

The album has been called the worst ever made. A Popjustice reviewer predicted that it would garner a lasting legacy as such, having been "recorded so cheaply and with such little regard for the art of pop that the final product simply does not count as music." Peter Robinson, the editor of Popjustice, wrote a review for  The Guardian calling it an "album so bad that it would count as a new low for popular culture were it possible to class as either culture... or popular".

Commercial performance
The album was initially a commercial success in Ireland where it debuted at no 1 on the Irish Albums Chart, knocking Lady Gaga's The Fame off the top spot. The album dropped from no 2 in its second week to no 20 in its third week and spent a total of eight weeks on the chart. In the UK the album peaked at no 14, and exited the Top 100 after three weeks. The album had first-week sales of 16,362.

Pointing to the record's lacklustre chart performance in the UK, Gail Walker of the Belfast Telegraph predicted that the public "may have seen the last of Eoghan Quigg". His album considered a failure, Quigg was dropped by RCA Records.

Track listing

Charts

References

External links
Official Website of Eoghan Quigg

2009 albums
Eoghan Quigg albums
Covers albums